The Dardanelle Confederate Monument is located near the Yell County Courthouse on Union Street in Dardanelle, Arkansas, United States. Erected by the United Daughters of the Confederacy (UDC) in 1921, the monument was added to the National Register of Historic Places in 1996 as part of the Civil War Commemorative Sculpture Multiple Property Submission.

The UDC raised $1,760 ($ today) to construct the monument between two banks in downtown Dardanelle. Following the completion of a new bridge over the Arkansas River in 1930, the UDC suggested it be moved so that "all who
crossed the bridge would find themselves face to face with the image in marble of the greatest soldier in the world - the Confederate soldier." The monument was moved to the southeast corner of the courthouse grounds, where it has remained ever since. The monument formerly contained plumbing allowing it to operate as a fountain which has since been removed.

An inscription reads: "To the Confederate soldiers of Yell County, in appreciation of their splendid valor and loyalty, this monument is erected".

See also
 1921 in art
 List of Confederate monuments and memorials
 National Register of Historic Places listings in Yell County, Arkansas

References

1921 establishments in Arkansas
1921 sculptures
Confederate States of America monuments and memorials in Arkansas
Dardanelle, Arkansas
Outdoor sculptures in Arkansas
Relocated buildings and structures in Arkansas
Sculptures of men in Arkansas
Statues in Arkansas